Wylie High School (commonly Wylie High School or WHS) is a public high school located in Wylie, Texas (United States) and classified as a 6A school by the UIL. It is part of the Wylie Independent School District which covers south central Collin County and includes portions of the communities of Sachse, St. Paul and Murphy along with Wylie. Until the 2008 opening of Wylie East High School,  Wylie High School was the only high school in Wylie ISD.

In 2015, the school was rated "Met Standard" by the Texas Education Agency.

History
In the 1890s, the town of Wylie had been served by a small school with a small amount of funding, primarily contributed by the parents of the students of the schools. Ovid Birmingham noticed this problem while traveling and established Wylie ISD in 1901–1902. He set limits of the district that all citizens in that area would pay taxes to support the district. The Birmingham family soon provided money to build the original Wylie High School. Wylie High has resided in several different buildings in its history.

Beginning in the 1976 school year, Wylie High School moved to a new building at 516 Hilltop Lane. This building could hold up to 600 students prior to the 1985 expansion of the school. This building, once the new Wylie High School was opened in 1996, was converted into Wylie Junior High School, later becoming Burnett Junior High School, named after the former principal of Wylie High School, Grady Burnett.

Wylie East High School was opened for the 2007–2008 school year. The school initially served solely ninth grade students.  Wylie East became a 9-12 school with the Class of 2012 being the first class to graduate after the district voted to have multiple 9-12 campuses in January 2008.  Wylie East began the 2009–2010 school year with freshmen and sophomores.  Wylie ISD serves most of the city of Wylie, including the city of St. Paul, a portion of the city of Murphy, and the Collin County portion of the city of Sachse.  Enrollment has grown to just over 10,000 students with more than 2685 full-time employees.

In 2020, former principal Virdie Montgomery drove 800 miles to personally congratulate all 612 graduating seniors after graduation ceremonies were canceled due to the Covid-19 pandemic.

Activities
The extracurricular activities offered at Wylie High School are many and varied due to the school's large size.  There are chapters of national organizations such as the National Honor Society and the Air Force Junior ROTC, as well as service organizations such as SkillsUSA, Rachel's Challenge, Spanish Club, French Club, Debate, and FCCLA.  The usual range of athletic and music organizations, Choir, Band, Orchestra and Theatre, are available for students to join also including Drill Team and Cheer.

Athletics
The Wylie Pirates compete in these sports:

Baseball
Basketball
Cross Country
Football (State Championship in 1978)
Golf
Lacrosse
Powerlifting
Soccer
Softball
Tennis
Track and Field
Volleyball
Wrestling

References

External links

 
 Wylie Pirate Wrestling Booster Club

Wylie Independent School District (Collin County, Texas) high schools
Educational institutions established in 1905
1905 establishments in Texas